Schoenus nigricans is a species of sedge known by the common names black bog-rush and black sedge. It is native to Eurasia, parts of Africa, Australia, and southern North America, including Mexico and the southernmost United States. It grows in many types of wetlands and other moist and alkaline habitat, including marshes, springs, seeps, peat bogs, heath, and alkali flats. This perennial plant grows in low, tight clumps 20 to 70 centimeters tall, with threadlike leaves bearing wide, dark brown ligules. The inflorescence is a small, flattened cluster of dark spikelets. The fruit is an achene coated in a hard, white shell.

References

External links
Schoenus nigricans. CalPhotos.

nigricans
Plants described in 1753
Taxa named by Carl Linnaeus
Flora of Malta